Cures is a commune in the Sarthe department in the Pays de la Loire region in north-western France.

See also 
 Communes of the Sarthe department

References 

Communes of Sarthe